Brassic is a British comedy sitcom, created by Joe Gilgun and Danny Brocklehurst. It premiered on Sky One in the United Kingdom on 22 August 2019. It follows the lives of Vinnie and his five friends as they live their lives in their northern town of Hawley. The working-class group commit various crimes to keep money in their pockets, but as they get older some of them start to wonder if there's more to life away from the town.

The first series consisted of six episodes, which concluded on 19 September 2019. It was recommissioned for a second series, which was released entirely on 7 May 2020, once again consisting of six episodes.

Series overview

Episodes

Series 1 (2019)

Series 2 (2020)

Series 3 (2021)

Series 4 (2022)

References

External links

 https://www.sky.com/watch/brassic

Lists of British sitcom episodes